Paracricotopus is a genus of European non-biting midges in the subfamily Orthocladiinae of the bloodworm family (Chironomidae).

Chironomidae
Diptera of Europe